Chaowai Subdisrict is a subdistrict inside Chaoyang District, Beijing, China. It is bordering Sanlitun and Dongzhimen Subdistricts to the north, Hujialou Subdistrict to the east, Jianwai Subdistrict to the south, Dongsi, Chaoyangmen and Jianguomen Subdistricts to the west. Tt has a total population of 33,212 as of the 2020 census.

The name of this subdistrict refers to the area to the east (i.e. "outside" of) Chaoyangmen Gate of Ming city wall.

History

Administrative Division 

As of 2021, there are 7 communities within the subdistrict:

Landmarks 
Four massive buildings—the Fulllink Tower, Union Plaza, China Life Tower and Prime Tower—sit along the southwestern part of the area. This is matched with a lot of residential high-rises in the northwest.

The northern central area is home to Dongyue Temple at Shenlu Road. The southern central area is full of even newer modern high-rise buildings, such as Chaowaimen, an office building which is nearing completion.

The northeastern area is home to a smorgasbord of banks, including a sizeable building belonging to the Industrial and Commercial Bank of China. The southeastern part, meanwhile, is a technology hub, home to the Bainaohui complex, which has numerous PC-related shops. Next to Bainaohui is the well-known Landao Tower.

The Chaowai area overlaps with the Dongdaqiao crossing.

Chaowai is a hub for nightlife activity. Two KTV shops, plenty of restaurants, and the decor, make this part of the city appear like night doesn't affect its activity. Meanwhile, the ongoing development continues throughout the night.

The Chaowai region has traffic problems of its own. Traffic on Chaoyangmen Outer Street is often congested, especially at peak times. Both ends of the Chaowai region are served by Beijing underground (the eastern end will soon be hooked up with Line 10 of the Beijing underground rail network).

Chaoyangmen Outer Street runs through the centre of the region.

See also
List of township-level divisions of Beijing

References

Chaoyang District, Beijing
Subdistricts of Beijing